Ernest Charles (Minneapolis, Minnesota, November 21, 1895 – Beverly Hills, California, April 16, 1984) was an American composer of art songs.

Life and musical career
Charles was born in Minnesota with the surname Grosskopf.  He attended The University of Southern California as a college student and studied singing with Charles Modini Wood.  He eventually went to New York City, changed his surname to Charles, and began his professional life as a singer, performing in vaudeville and Broadway reviews, including Earl Carroll's Vanities in 1928 and the George White Scandals in 1929.  His songs became widely known after 1932, when John Charles Thomas performed his song Clouds in a New York recital.  Following that success, he continued to compose songs regularly until about 1950. At that time he lived with his wife, a mezzo-soprano, in New York City, and produced the radio program Great Moments in Music.  He returned to California in 1953, settling in Beverly Hills, where he spent the remaining years of his life.

He was selected as a National Patron of Delta Omicron, an international professional music fraternity. He was a member of Phi Mu Alpha, an honorary member of the Apollo Club of Minneapolis, and a fellow of the California-based American Institute of Fine Arts.  He joined ASCAP in 1934, and served as an Assistant Executive Secretary of the American Guild of Musical Artists (AGMA) from 1937 until at least 1966.

Musical works
Charles composed around 45 songs for voice and piano in the years between 1930 and 1950.  Most were published individually by G. Schirmer, and a few have been reissued in various song anthologies and collections of American art songs from the same publisher.  The songs are known for their rubato, sweeping vocal lines, sumptuous melodies, and ingenuous charm.  Two of his songs are popular encores: the Viennese Waltz Let My Song Fill Your Heart, made famous by Eileen Farrell; and When I Have Sung My Songs, recorded by such singers as Kirsten Flagstad, Rosa Ponselle, and Thomas Hampson, and featured in the closing credits of the 2016 film Florence Foster Jenkins, sung by lead actress Meryl Streep.

Published songs
published by G. Schirmer unless otherwise noted
Always You, 1936
And So, Goodbye (E. Charles), 1938
Bon Voyage (Velma Hitchcock), 1939
Carmé (Neapolitan Song), arr., 1938
Clouds, 1932
Crescent Moon, 1939
Dawn (E. Charles), Boston Music, 1933
Disenchantment (Mona Bonelli), 1940
L'Envoi (Sarojini Naidu), 1935
The Harp Aline Kilmer, 1936
The House on the Hill (E. Charles), 1933
Hymn to the United States Navy (Foster G. Carling), 1943
If You Only Knew (G. Johnston-Jervis), 1935
Incline Thine Ear (Isaiah 55: 3, 1), 1948
Let My Song Fill Your Heart ("Viennese Waltz"), 1936
Little Green Gate to Heaven (Fred Meadows), Chappell-Harms, 1933
Lord of the Years (Velma Hitchcock), 1938
Love (William Bruno), 1941
Love is of God (John 4:7-8), 1949
Message (Sara Teasdale)
My Lady Walks in Loveliness (Mona Modini Wood), 1932
Night (Sydney King Russell), 1944
Oh Little River (Earl Benham), 1946
O Lovely World (Velma Hitchcock), 1947
Over the Land is April (Robert Louis Stevenson), Willis Music, 1937
Over the Wall of My Garden (William Bruno),  Chappell & Co., 1929
Parting (William Bruno), Irving Berlin Standard Music Corporation, 1929
Psalm XXIII (Psalm 23), Ecco Music, Beverly Hills, California, 1956
Psalm of Exaltation (Psalm 27), 1951
Remembrance (Dorothy Tete), 1949
Romany Honeymoon (R. Atwater), Boston Music Co., 1933
Save Me, God (Psalm 69), 1947
Someone (E. Charles), 1937
Speak Not in Haste (Velma Hitchcock), 1936
The Spendthrift (Sarojini Naidu), 1935
Stampede, 1937
The Sussex Sailor (Alfred Noyes), 1933
Sweet Song of Long Ago (E. Charles), 1933
Take the Knocks, Lad (William Bruno), 1957
When I Have Sung My Songs, 1934
The White Swan, 1941
A Wish (Anita McLean Willison), 1936
Who Keeps the Years (E. Olmstead), 1940
You Are! (E. Charles), Boston Music, 1935
Youth, 1928

Other compositions
published by G. Schirmer unless otherwise noted
Christmas Song (Robert Herrick), SATB solos, SATB chorus, organ, 1951
Festival Jubilate, mixed voices, R. L. Huntzinger, 1937
The Greatness of the Lord, SATB chorus, 1957
Waltz Interlude ("in the Viennese Style"), piano solo, 1788

Footnotes

References

.

External links
http://www.lieder.net/lieder/c/charles.html Texts of some songs by Ernest Charles
http://delta-omicron.org Ernest Charles is listed as a National Patron under the subheading "National: Patrons/Patronesses"
http://www.priscillasings.com/WhenIHaveSungMySongs.html A singer writes about one of Charles's songs
https://web.archive.org/web/20131207192155/http://theaifa.org/home.html The American Institute of Fine Arts

1895 births
1984 deaths
20th-century classical composers
20th-century American composers
20th-century American male musicians
American classical composers
American male classical composers
Classical musicians from California
Classical musicians from Minnesota
Classical musicians from New York (state)
Musicians from Beverly Hills, California
Musicians from Minneapolis
Musicians from New York City
University of Southern California alumni